The 2nd South African Infantry Brigade was an infantry brigade of the army of the Union of South Africa during World War II.  The Brigade formed part of the 1st South African Infantry Division and was formed on 13 August 1940.  It  served in East Africa and the Western Desert and was disbanded on 1 January 1943.

In September 1939 Niehorster lists the brigade as being part of Eastern Province Command.
 
In the East African Campaign, the Brigade was led by Brigadier F.L.A. Buchanan and consisted of:

 1st Natal Mounted Rifles
 1st Field Force Battalion 
 2nd Field Force Battalion 
 No. 2 S.A. Armoured Car Company 
 12th Field Company, SA Corps of Engineers 
 12th Field Ambulance, SA Medical Corps 
 No. 2 Mobile General Workshops, SA Technical Services Corps 
 3 Brigade Signals Company, SA Corps of Signals

During the Western Desert Campaign (at the time of the Second Battle of El Alamein), the Officer Commanding was Brig. W.H.E. Poole and the brigade comprised the following units:

 1st Cape Town Highlanders SA Infantry Corps 
 1st Natal Mounted Rifles SA Infantry Corps 
 1st Field Force Battalion SA Infantry Corps 
 2nd Field Force Battalion SA Infantry Corps 
 B Company (Machine Gun), Die Middelandse Regiment SA Infantry Corps 
 4th Company (Machine Gun), Regiment President Steyn SA Infantry Corps 
 1st and 2nd Anti-Tank Batteries SA Artillery Corps 
 3rd Light Anti-Aircraft Battery (less two Troops) SA Artillery Corps 
 1st, 3rd and 14th Field Batteries of 1st Field Regt SA Artillery Corps

Notes

References

Bibliography
 

Infantry brigades of South Africa in World War II
Military units and formations disestablished in 1943
Military units and formations established in 1940